Gustav Adolf Warneck (1834–1910) was a German missiologist. In 1874, he established the first German missiological journal, Allgemeine Missionszeitschift. He was also involved in the founding of the German Protestant Missions Committee in 1885, serving as secretary until 1901. He held the first university chair in missiology at Halle University from 1896 to 1908. He is considered to be one of the first missiologists. David Bosch describes him as "the father of missiology as a theological discipline."

Life 

The oldest son of a master needlemaker, Warneck went from the family needleshop to study at the Francke Foundation and then studied with the theological faculty at Halle University beginning in 1855. During his studies he became a member of Hallenser Wingolf, a Christian non-denominational student association. After graduation he served as a private tutor and became an assistant pastor in Dommitzsch, Germany. In 1871 he was appointed as theological teacher for the Rhenish Mission Society in Barmen. Due to illness, however, in 1874 he moved to the parish office in Rothenschirmbach near Eisleben.

In 1874 Warneck founded the Allgemeine Missions-Zeitschrift, which he published in conjunction with Reinhold Grundemann. In 1879 he founded the Saxon Provincial Mission Conference. In 1896 he was appointed Professor of the Science of Mission (missiology) in the University of Halle which was the first time missiology was an academic discipline at a German university.

He was buried in the north cemetery in Halle an der Saale and wished for the words on his tombstone, "Let my grace be enough for you, because my strength is mighty in the weak."

Writings 
 Missionsstunden, Bd. 1: Die Mission im Lichte der Bibel. 1878
 Die gegenseitigen Beziehungen zwischen der modernen Mission und Kultur. 1879
Die christliche Mission : ihre sachliche Begründung und thatsächliche Ausführung in der Gegenwart. 1879
 Abriß einer Geschichte der protestantischen Missionen. 1882
 Modern Missions and culture: their mutual relations. 1883
 Missionsstunden, Bd. 2: Die Mission in Bildern aus ihrer Geschichte. 1884
 Outline of the history of the Protestant missions from the Reformation to the present time : a contribution to recent church history. 1884
 Protestantische Beleuchtung der römischen Angriffe auf die evangelische Heidenmission. 1884–85
 Welche Pflichten legen uns unsere Kolonien auf?. 1885
 Die Mission in der Schule. Ein Handbuch für Lehrer. 1887
 Die Stellung der evangelischen Mission zur Sklavenfrage. 1889
 History of Protestant missions. 1901
 The scientific study of missions., 1909
 Prayer for missions. 1930
 Werner Raupp (Hrsg.): Mission in Quellentexten. Geschichte der Deutschen Evangelischen Mission von der Reformation bis zur Weltmissionskonferenz Edinburgh 1910, Erlangen/Bad Liebenzell 1990, S. 364–378 (Einl., Quellenauszüge, Lit.).* Evangelische Missionslehre. 1892, modernisierte Ausgabe 2015

Weblinks 
  Gustav Warneck Biography
  The Legacy of Gustav Warneck

  Warneck, Gustav (1834-1910)

References

Further reading 
 Axenfeld, Karl: Missionswissenschaftliche Studien : Festschrift zum Geburtstag des Herrn Prof. D. Dr. Gustav Warneck

 Becker, Dieter & Andreas Feldtkeller: Es begann in Halle ... : Missionswissenschaft von Gustav Warneck bis heut

 Daubanton, François Elbertus: In memoriam Prof. Dr. Gustav Warneck : toespraak bij het hervatten van zijne colleges den zes-en-twintigsten Januari 1911
 Dürr, Johannes: Sendende und werdende Kirche in der Missionstheologie Gustav Warneck's
 Balz, Heinrich: "Missionsobjekt" und selbständige Kirche eine Relektüre von G. Warneck, J. Schmidlin und M. Kähler
 Griffioen, Dirk:  Christelijke zending en wereldgodsdiensten : de godsdiensttheologie van Gustav Warneck, Hendrik Kraemer en J.E. Lesslie Newbigin in context = Christian mission and worldreligions : the theology of religion of Gustav Warneck, Hendrik Kraemer and J.E. Lesslie Newbigin in context

 Kähler, Martin & Joh Warneck: D. Gustav Warneck, 1834-1910 : Blätter der Erinnerung

 Kasdorf, Hans: Gustav Warnecks missiologisches Erbe eine biographisch-historische Untersuchung

 Lefebvre, Pierre:  L'influence de Gustav Warneck sur la Theologie missionnaire catholique

 Lefebvre, Pierre:  La théologie missionnaire de Gustav Warneck
 Teinonen, Seppo: Gustav Warneckin varhaisen lähetysteorian teologiset perusteet
 Werner Raupp (Hrsg.): Mission in Quellentexten. Geschichte der  Deutschen Evangelischen Mission von der Reformation bis zur Weltmissionskonferenz Edinburgh 1910, Erlangen/Bad Liebenzell 1990, p. 364–378 (with introduction, source excerpts, literature). 

 Werner Raupp: Gustav Warneck. In: Biographisch-Bibliographisches Kirchenlexikon (BBKL), Vol. 13, Herzberg: Bautz 1998, col. 359–371 (with detailed Bibliography).
 Werner Raupp: Art.: Warneck, Gustav Adolf, in: Neue Deutsche Biographie (NDB), Vol. 27, Berlin: Duncker & Humblot 2020, p. 431–432.

1834 births
1910 deaths

Missiologists

Practical theologians
19th-century German Protestant theologians